Hassan Jaafari (born 27 July 1991) is a Saudi Arabian football player who plays for Hajer as a midfielder.

Honours
Al-Qadsiah
First Division: 2014–15

References

External links
 

Living people
1991 births
Association football midfielders
Saudi Arabian footballers
Al-Qadsiah FC players
Al-Fayha FC players
Hajer FC players
Place of birth missing (living people)
Saudi First Division League players
Saudi Professional League players
Saudi Arabian Shia Muslims